Theba arinagae is a species of land snail in the family Helicidae, the typical snails. It is endemic to the Canary Islands, where it is known only from the top of a volcano. Its entire range is about 4 square kilometers and it is considered a critically endangered species.

See also
List of non-marine molluscs of the Canary Islands

References

External links
Picture of a shell of this species

Helicidae
Invertebrates of the Canary Islands
Endemic fauna of the Canary Islands
Gastropods described in 1987
Taxonomy articles created by Polbot